Saputhantrige Don Prabahath Aravinda Premaratne (born 15 March 1992) is a Sri Lankan cricketer. He made his first-class debut for Kurunegala Youth Cricket Club in the 2011–12 Premier Trophy on 9 March 2012.

References

External links
 

1992 births
Living people
Sri Lankan cricketers
Kurunegala Youth Cricket Club cricketers
Sri Lanka Ports Authority Cricket Club cricketers
People from Chilaw